Gordon Sumner (born 10 February 1965) is a former Australian rules footballer who played with Collingwood in the Victorian Football League (VFL).

Sumner was recruited from Warburton Millgrove. On his debut, Sumner was one of the best afield for Collingwood, with 29 disposals (22 kicks), against the Sydney Swans at Victoria Park in the fifth round of the 1985 VFL season. He didn't miss a game for the rest of the year. In 1986 he played eight games, all early in the season.

He is currently a senior assistant coach at the Silvan Football Club, and also loves a quaddie most days of the week.

References

1965 births
Australian rules footballers from Victoria (Australia)
Collingwood Football Club players
Living people